Roger Blais may refer to:
 Roger Blais (geological engineer)
 Roger Blais (filmmaker)